This is a list of burial of prominent people in Holy Trinity Cathedral in Addis Ababa, Ethiopia.

References

Holy Trinity Cathedral